Obloke is a small village on the right bank of the Bača River in the Municipality of Tolmin in the Littoral region of Slovenia.

Geography

In the southernmost part of the village's territory there is a pair of road and rail tunnels on the route between Hudajužna and Koritnica.

Church

The parish church in the settlement is dedicated to the Three Kings and belongs to the Diocese of   Koper.

References

External links

Obloke on Geopedia

Populated places in the Municipality of Tolmin